"Every Day I Have the Blues" is a blues standard.

Every Day I Have the Blues or Everyday I Have the Blues may also refer to:

Every Day I Have the Blues (Jimmy Rushing album)
Everyday I Have the Blues (T-Bone Walker album)
Everyday I Have the Blues (Joe Williams album)

Disambiguation pages